Ankaful is a town in the Central Region of Ghana. It is under the jurisdiction of the Cape Coast Metropolitan Assembly. The town is known for two things:
The Ankaful Psychiatric Hospital
The Ankaful Maximum Security Prison

References

Populated places in the Central Region (Ghana)